Park Benches is a 2009 French film directed by Bruno Podalydès, with an all-star cast.

Plot 
Bancs Publics tells the story of a lonely man, observed by employees from an office across the street, onlookers from the Square des Francines, and clients in the Brico-Dream shop.

Cast

 Ridan as The singer
 Denis Podalydès as Aimé Mermot
 Samir Guesmi as Romain
 Bruno Podalydès as Bretelle
 Laure Calamy as Opportune
 Olivier Gourmet as Maurice Begeard
 Chantal Lauby as Pascale
 Hippolyte Girardot as Framework #1
 Michel Vuillermoz as Framework #2
 Josiane Balasko as Solange Renivelle
 Éric Prat as The building inhabitant
 Thierry Lhermitte as The medecin
 Micheline Dax as The philosopher neighbor
 Bernard Campan as The suspicious neighbor
 Julie Depardieu as The suspicious neighbor's wife
 Pierre Arditi as Monsieur Borelly
 Claude Rich as The backgammon player #1
 Michel Aumont as The backgammon player #2
 Didier Bourdon as The captain #1
 Nicole Garcia as The radio's woman
 Vincent Elbaz as The jogger
 Mathieu Amalric as The pram father
 Éric Elmosnino as The sleeper
 Chiara Mastroianni as Marianne's mother
 Emmanuelle Devos as Arthur's mother
 Élie Semoun as The dredger #2
 Isabelle Candelier as The left woman
 Guilaine Londez as The wallpapers client
 Pascal Légitimus as The Beuck DCA client
 Amira Casar as The socket client
 Michael Lonsdale as The mat client
 Christophe Beaucarne as The Sporgex client
 Catherine Deneuve as The little cabinet client 
 Benoît Poelvoorde as The peg client
 George Aguilar as Gary

References

External links 
 
 
 Park Benches at Fluge! Movie info
 

2009 films
French romantic comedy films
Films directed by Bruno Podalydès
2000s French films